How to Train Your Dragon: The Hidden World (also known as How to Train Your Dragon 3) is a 2019 American computer-animated action fantasy film loosely based on the book series by Cressida Cowell. Produced by DreamWorks Animation and distributed by Universal Pictures, it is the sequel to How to Train Your Dragon 2 (2014) and the third and final installment in the How to Train Your Dragon trilogy. Written and directed by Dean DeBlois and produced by Bonnie Arnold and Brad Lewis, the film stars the voices of Jay Baruchel, America Ferrera, Cate Blanchett, Craig Ferguson, and F. Murray Abraham. The film follows Hiccup as he seeks a dragon utopia known as the "Hidden World" while coming to terms with Toothless' new bond with a female Fury, as they deal with the threat of a ruthless dragon hunter named Grimmel the Grisly.

The first discussions about a second sequel to How to Train Your Dragon began in December 2010 when DreamWorks Animation CEO Jeffrey Katzenberg announced that there would be a third film in the series. DeBlois stated that the first sequel was being intentionally designed as the second act of the trilogy. The film underwent changes for release dates due to distributor changes. The animation challenges of the production required DreamWorks Animation to update and invent new software to handle complex tasks, such as lighting the Light Fury dragon.

How to Train Your Dragon: The Hidden World was released on January 3, 2019, in Australia, and on February 22 in the United States. The film marks the first DreamWorks Animation film to be distributed by Universal Pictures, two years after parent company NBCUniversal acquired DreamWorks Animation in 2016. Like its predecessors, it received acclaim from critics, who praised its animation, voice acting, musical score, and emotional weight of the conclusion. It grossed over $525 million worldwide, becoming the fifth highest-grossing animated film of 2019, as well as Universal's highest-grossing animated film not to be produced by Illumination. How to Train Your Dragon: The Hidden World received several awards and nominations: five nominations for Annie Awards and a Golden Globe. At the 92nd Academy Awards, the film was nominated for Best Animated Feature.

Plot

One year after becoming chieftain, Hiccup, his Night Fury Toothless, and their fellow dragon-riders continue to rescue captured dragons to bring them to Berk and its bustling dragon-human utopia. Their efforts have resulted in the island becoming overpopulated with dragons. In response, Hiccup desires to find the "Hidden World", a safe haven for dragons spoken of by his late father, Stoick. Meanwhile, a white female Fury dragon, held captive by warlords, is given to infamous dragon hunter Grimmel the Grisly as bait for him to capture Toothless for the warlords' use as an alpha.

Toothless discovers the white Fury in the woods, and the two become enchanted with each other until the white Fury, sensing Hiccup's and Astrid's nearby presence, flees. Astrid then dubs the white Fury a "Light Fury". Hiccup and Tuffnut later discover Grimmel's dragon traps in the area. Grimmel visits Hiccup that night, demanding he hand over Toothless while revealing he single-handedly endangered the Night Fury species, but Hiccup has prepared an ambush for him. Grimmel escapes while his Deathgripper dragons burn down Hiccup's house and most of Berk. Hiccup then rallies the citizens and dragons to leave Berk on a quest to find the Hidden World and safety from dragon hunters.

Mid-journey, the Berkians discover an island on which they initially plan to rest, but soon begin to settle there, dubbing it "New Berk". Seeing Toothless' inability to fly solo hindering his growing relationship with the Light Fury, Hiccup rebuilds an automatic tailfin for him. Upon receiving it, Toothless flies off, meeting up with the Light Fury and flying with her to an unknown land. On a scouting patrol, Valka notices Grimmel's approaching army and reports back to Hiccup. Hiccup and the dragon riders head to capture Grimmel but fall into his trap and barely escape. Ruffnut is captured but irritates Grimmel until he lets her go.

Hiccup, Astrid, and her dragon Stormfly, searching for Toothless, find the Hidden World and see Toothless and the Light Fury leading the dragons as a happily mated couple. When the two humans are soon discovered, Toothless rescues them and returns them to the Berkians, with Hiccup realizing that his people would be intruders and unsafe in the Hidden World. Ruffnut returns, but unbeknownst to her, Grimmel had secretly followed her to New Berk. Grimmel appears and captures Toothless and the Light Fury, who had followed them to New Berk. Toothless' alpha status allows Grimmel to capture the rest of Berk's dragons by holding the Light Fury hostage.

With Astrid's encouragement, Hiccup sets out with the dragon riders to stop Grimmel and his army. Gliding on wingsuits, they catch Grimmel's army off-guard, igniting a battle, and freeing the dragons. With help from Stormfly, Hiccup frees Toothless while Grimmel drugs the Light Fury into obeying him. Hiccup and Toothless give chase and defeat Grimmel's Deathgrippers, but Grimmel tranquilizes Toothless midair, causing the dragon to fall helplessly. Hiccup, realizing he cannot rescue Toothless alone, frees the Light Fury and implores her to save Toothless. Hiccup is fully prepared to sacrifice himself to save Toothless as both he and Grimmel plummet toward the sea, but the Light Fury returns in time to save Hiccup, while Grimmel falls into the ocean.

Back on the island, Toothless and Hiccup fully realize that dragons will never be safe in the human world, at least for the time being. Hiccup bids an emotional farewell to Toothless as the Berkians tearfully set their dragons free to live in the Hidden World, the Light Fury leading the dragons away and Toothless following them. Sometime later, Hiccup and Astrid finally marry and become the chieftains of New Berk.

About a decade later, thirty-year-old Toothless and the Light Fury have mated and given birth to three hybrid dragon fledglings. Hiccup, Astrid, and their two children sail across the sea to visit them at the edge of the Hidden World. After introducing his son and daughter to his old friend, Hiccup and Astrid take their children flying on Toothless and Stormfly, accompanied by the Light Fury and their offspring. Hiccup vows that until humankind is ready to co-exist peacefully with one another, the dragons will stay hidden while the Berkians guard their secret as the centuries go by.

Voice cast 

 Jay Baruchel – Hiccup Horrendous Haddock III, the son of Stoick the Vast and Valka, the newly crowned Viking chief of Berk, the one who initially trained the dragons, and Astrid's husband.
 A.J. Kane voices a younger Hiccup.
 America Ferrera – Astrid Hofferson, an excellent fighter and Hiccup's wife.
 F. Murray Abraham – Grimmel the Grisly, an infamous dragon hunter who is responsible for the near-extinction of the Night Furies.
 Cate Blanchett – Valka Haddock, a dragon rescuer and Hiccup's mother, now living on Berk after twenty years of isolation.
 Gerard Butler – Stoick the Vast, the late father of Hiccup and Berk's previous chieftain, as seen in flashbacks.
 Craig Ferguson – Gobber the Belch, a seasoned warrior, blacksmith and dragon dentist.
 Jonah Hill – Snotlout Jorgenson, a brash, overconfident, and fairly unintelligent but reliable friend of Hiccup.
 Christopher Mintz-Plasse – Fishlegs Ingerman, an enthusiastic friend of Hiccup knowledgeable in dragon lore which he often relates in a role-playing game style.
 Kristen Wiig – Ruffnut Thorston, Tuffnut's fraternal twin who is friends with Hiccup.
 Justin Rupple – Tuffnut Thorston, Ruffnut's fraternal twin who is friends with Hiccup. He was originally voiced by T.J. Miller in the first two films and the TV series.
 Kit Harington – Eret, a former dragon hunter who used to work for Drago Bludvist, who has joined the dragon riders after the events of the second film.
 Julia Emelin – Griselda the Grievous, an aggressive warlord who works with Grimmel.
 Ólafur Darri Ólafsson – Ragnar the Rock, an incompetent warlord who works with Grimmel.
 James Sie – Chaghatai Khan, a less aggressive and stubborn warlord who works with Grimmel.
 David Tennant – Ivar the Witless, a dragon trapper who works for the Warlords.
 Tennant also voices Spitelout Jorgenson, the father of Snotlout.
 Robin Atkin Downes – Ack, a blond-bearded Viking.
 Kieron Elliot – Hoark, a Viking with a knotted beard.
 Ashley Jensen – Phlegma the Fierce, a female Viking who works as a botanist at the School of Dragons.
 Gideon Emery – A trapper.
 Randy Thom – vocal effects for Toothless and the Light Fury.

Production
In December 2010, DreamWorks Animation CEO Jeffrey Katzenberg announced that there would also be a third film in the series: "How To Train Your Dragon is at least three: maybe more, but we know there are at least three chapters to that story." Dean DeBlois, the writer and director of the second and the third film, stated that How to Train Your Dragon 2 was being intentionally designed as the second act of the trilogy: "There are certain characters and situations that come into play in the second film that will become much more crucial to the story by the third." DeBlois said in an interview that the third part would be released in 2016. Although the series has taken a different path of telling a story of Hiccup and Vikings, author Cressida Cowell revealed that the trilogy and the book series will have similar endings (with "an explanation as to why dragons are no more").

The film was produced by Bonnie Arnold and Brad Lewis. DeBlois and Chris Sanders were the executive producers; Sanders was an executive producer of the second film and co-director of the first. Jay Baruchel, Gerard Butler, Craig Ferguson, America Ferrera, Jonah Hill, Christopher Mintz-Plasse and Kristen Wiig returned in the third film, with Justin Rupple replacing T.J. Miller as Tuffnut. DeBlois revealed that Miller did originally return to voice Tuffnut, but DreamWorks recast him after the actor's sexual assault allegations and arrest for calling in a fake bomb threat. Cate Blanchett also reprised her role as Valka from the second film. On November 14, 2017, it was announced that Kit Harington would reprise his role as Eret and F. Murray Abraham had joined the cast. During the earlier stages of production, DeBlois stated that Djimon Hounsou would also return as Drago Bludvist. It was even planned to have Drago redeemed by the film's end, but halfway through development, DreamWorks co-founder Steven Spielberg convinced DeBlois that the story of Drago's redemption required more screen time that they could not provide, causing his inclusion to be scrapped. On April 17, 2018, DreamWorks Animation announced that the sequel's title would be How to Train Your Dragon: The Hidden World. The animation challenges of the production required DreamWorks Animation to update and invent new software to handle complex tasks, such as lighting the Light Fury dragon.

Music

John Powell, who composed the previous two films, returned to compose the film's score. In addition, Powell's collaborators Batu Sener, Anthony Willis, and Paul Mounsey are credited as additional composers. Also returning from the previous films, Jónsi wrote a new song for the film, titled "Together From Afar", which was released as a single on January 31, 2019. Jónsi also provided vocals for a track titled "The Hidden World".

Release
In September 2012, 20th Century Fox, DreamWorks Animation's then-distributor partner, and the studio itself announced the film was originally going to be released on June 17, 2016. In September 2014, the film's release date was pushed back a year from its original release date of June 17, 2016 to June 9, 2017. DeBlois explained the release date shifts as such: "It's just that these movies take three years. I think it was a little ambitious to say 2016... As is normally the case, they kind of throw darts out into the future and wherever they land they call that a release date until we start talking about it in practical terms, and then it's like, 'Uh yeah that's not enough time'. So knowing that they take three years from this moment, from outlining and writing the screenplay through to the final lighting of it, it's just a process of building models and doing tests and animating, storyboarding, the whole thing just adds up to about three years."

In January 2015, the release date was pushed back a year from June 9, 2017 to June 29, 2018 following DreamWorks Animation's corporate restructuring and lay-offs meant to maximize the company's "creative talent and resources, reduce costs, and drive profitability." On June 18, 2016, the release date was moved up from June 29, 2018 to May 18, 2018, taking the release date of the Warner Animation Group's The Lego Movie 2: The Second Part. On December 5, 2016, the US release date was pushed back from May 18, 2018 to March 1, 2019. The release date was moved up for a final time from March 1, 2019 to February 22, 2019, taking the slot of The Turning, a live-action DreamWorks film which in turn was pushed back to January 24, 2020.

Home media
Universal Pictures Home Entertainment released How to Train Your Dragon: The Hidden World for digital download on May 7, 2019, and on Blu-ray, 4K Ultra HD Blu-ray, and DVD on May 21. Physical copies contain two 2018 short films: Bilby and Bird Karma.

Video games
Unlike the first two films of the trilogy, The Hidden World does not have a tie-in game based on its plot. Instead, there are two games set before the events of the film, which are the top-down action adventure game DreamWorks Dragons: Dawn of New Riders available on consoles and personal computers (Nintendo Switch, PlayStation 4, Xbox One and Microsoft Windows) and the match-3 game Dragons: Titan Uprising for mobile devices (iOS and Android).

Reception

Box office
How to Train Your Dragon: The Hidden World grossed $160.8 million in the United States and Canada, and $361 million in other territories, for a worldwide gross of $521.8 million, against a production budget of $129 million. Deadline Hollywood calculated the film's net profit as $130million, accounting for production budgets, marketing, talent participations, and other costs; box office grosses and home media revenues placed it 12th on their list of 2019's "Most Valuable Blockbusters".

In the United States and Canada, How to Train Your Dragon: The Hidden World held early screenings at 1,000 theaters on February 2, 2019 and grossed $2.5 million, one of the highest advance showing totals ever. It was released alongside the wide expansion of Fighting with My Family, and was initially projected to gross $40–45 million from 4,259 theaters in its opening weekend. After making $17.5 million on its first day (including $3 million from Thursday night previews), weekend projections were increased to $60 million. It went 
on to debut to $55 million finishing first at the box office. The film made $30 million in its second weekend, retaining the top spot, before being dethroned by newcomer Captain Marvel in its third.

The film grossed $1.5 million on its opening day in Australia, setting a record for a DreamWorks Animation film in that country (surpassing Shrek 2). In New Zealand, the film grossed $173,000 on its opening day, ranking as DreamWorks Animation's second biggest opening day in the country, behind Shrek 2. By its third weekend of international release the film has grossed a total of $41 million. As of March 24, 2019, the film's largest markets in other territories were China ($53.7 million), Russia ($26.8 million), France ($25.0 million), United Kingdom ($24.8 million) and Mexico ($21.0 million).

Critical response
The website's critical consensus reads, "The rare trilogy capper that really works, How to Train Your Dragon: The Hidden World brings its saga to a visually dazzling and emotionally affecting conclusion." On Metacritic, the film has a weighted average score of 71 out of 100, based on 42 critics, indicating "generally favorable reviews". Audiences polled by CinemaScore gave the film an average grade of "A" on an A+ to F scale (the same score earned by the first two films), while those at PostTrak gave it a 90% positive score and a 77% "definite recommend."

Jennifer Bisset of CNET praised the voice performances of the main characters, while also citing the visuals and action sequences, and singled out the development of the relationship between Hiccup and Toothless, saying, "Continuing a series-long focus on family and love, How to Train Your Dragon: The Hidden World narrows on what those values mean for Toothless. He experiences romance. He grows up. And with heavy, satisfied hearts, we let him, and Hiccup, go."

Michael Nordine of IndieWire gave the film a B, saying, "Directed once again by Dean DeBlois, The Hidden World strikes a bittersweet chord in reminding its young audience that all good things — including the age of dragons — must come to an end." He later went on to applaud the CGI, lauding the "arresting visuals", and stating that "The animation itself is striking — an early sequence in which the sky is filled with dragons is an early sign of the visual treats to come — and ends up being the film's highlight." Ben Kenigsberg of The New York Times gave a positive review of the characters and emotional messages of the film, writing "More bittersweet and less triumphal than its predecessors, and directed by a returning Dean DeBlois, The Hidden World concerns the exigencies that Hiccup faces as a leader, both politically and personally. If you truly love that dragon you trained, its message says, let him go."

Conversely, some critics felt the film had the presence of too many juggled sub-plots and an obligatory ending, with Movie Crypt concluding that "Fans will enjoy seeing their characters grown and progressing as story arcs are closed, but the final resolution rings hollow. Ultimately, none of it appeared necessary other than a need to say goodbye; the dragons and their champions certainly earned a better conclusion than that." Kerry Lengel of The Arizona Republic says that "The plot is thin and holey and the characters are mostly just a single gag set on repeat" and calls it "a lazy effort."

Accolades

Future 
A live-action film unrelated to the animated trilogy was announced to be in development. It will be produced by Marc Platt Productions and distributed by Universal Pictures, with DeBlois set to return to write and direct. It is scheduled for release on March 14, 2025.

Notes

References

External links

 
 

2019 films
2019 3D films
2019 comedy films
2019 computer-animated films
2019 romantic drama films
2010s American animated films
2010s children's animated films
2010s children's fantasy films
2010s fantasy comedy films
2010s teen drama films
American adventure comedy films
American children's animated adventure films
American children's animated drama films
American children's animated fantasy films
American computer-animated films
American fantasy comedy films
American sequel films
American teen drama films
Animated films based on children's books
Animated films about dragons
Animated romance films
Films based on British novels
DreamWorks Animation animated films
Films about amputees
Films directed by Dean DeBlois
Films produced by Bonnie Arnold
Films produced by Brad Lewis
Films scored by John Powell
Films set in the Viking Age
Films set on fictional islands
High fantasy films
Films with screenplays by Dean DeBlois
How to Train Your Dragon
Universal Pictures animated films
Universal Pictures films
2010s English-language films